Lion is a 2006 Indian Malayalam language political thriller film written by Udaykrishna-Sibi K. Thomas and directed by Joshiy. The film stars Dileep, Kalasala Babu, Kavya Madhavan and Vijayaraghavan alongside a supporting cast that include Jagathy Sreekumar, Innocent, Sai Kumar, Shammi Thilakan, Riyaz Khan and Karthika. The film was produced by Noushad and distributed by Shan Entertainment. The film was a blockbuster at the box office. It was remade in Tamil as Nam Naadu and in Telugu as Evadaithe Nakenti.

Plot
The film revolves round a socio-political family where Balagangadhara Menon, the Education Minister lives with his son B.Krishnakumar a.k.a. Unni-a politician, his wife Lakshmi, three daughters and two sons-in-law. Also with them is his P.A Joseph. Menon is always fond of his sons-in-law Pavithran and Gopinath IAS, and thinks that his son is a barrier to him as he tries to control their corrupt activities. Menon wants to become the Chief Minister himself by increasing college fees and throwing away the blame Avarachan, the present C.M since Avarachan was an honest politician. This causes major protests throughout the state, but CM refuses to give in. Sharika a.k.a. Shari and her mother Devaki comes to their place as the former got a temporary school teacher post in the area. Both were servants in Menon's house long back, but was dispelled by him due to a childish love affair between Unni and Shari. Shari then involves in a public Drinking Water Case and seeks Menon for help. Finding that Menon is not reliable, she along with Unni goes to Collector's office but is again thrown back. Finally they move through Judicial ways and blocks the case.

Meanwhile, Unni's younger sister Meenakshi is in love with an ordinary school teacher Prasad and Unni tries to unite them. When Menon and others learn of this, they blindly refuses and wants A.S.P Harshan to marry Meenakshi as a part of their socio-political assets. Pavithran sends his henchmen to kill Prasad, and keeps Unni in prison in an unwarranted case. Meenakshi is forcefully married to Harshan, and Unni is helpless. Later Unni is released. The next day, Shari gets a cellphone belonging to the murderer of Prasad and she with the help of Unni goes to C.I Vijayan and submits the evidence. The murderer is arrested and subsequently Menon also, after being traced of a phone call from the former.

Menon decides to use this opportunity as a political game and blames C.M against this. Much irritated, C.M meets the Governor asking to dissolve the state assembly. The governor does so, and all MLAs including Menon are fired. The next general election is to be held soon and party initially decides to place Krishnakumar as candidate from his constituency instead of Menon. However, Menon convinces the party members to make him as the candidate later. Krishnakumar is once again depressed, but his friends force him to contest as Independent candidate, to which he agrees.

During the campaigning, Krishnakumar brings out the political dramas of his opponents and donates the ransom he obtained from Vendor Chandy and others as charity. Post election, Menon is surprised to find that Krishnakumar had won against him by a slight margin. Menon's party coalition wins seventy out of 140 seats and the opposition has 69. As Krishnakumar's support was required for the party to attain majority, he makes use of the situation by demanding the state Home Minister post. Even Balagangadhara Menon supports this and the party council has no choice and agrees. Thomman Chakko becomes the C.M while Krishnakumar and others becomes members of his cabinet.

Krishnakumar makes use of his position in good ways and eradicates most of the corrupt evil activities in the state with the help of Police force and his friends. He even chases down high politicians and brings out the black money they kept. He transfers his brother-in-law ASP Harshan to Bihar.  Thomman Chakko is also blackmailed against his corrupt assets and has no choice than obeying Krishnakumar. Meanwhile, Krishnakumar convinces Shari to marry him, and both register their marriage soon. This irritates Menon and he dispels both of them from entering house. Later, Krishnakumar and Shari began to live happily in Minister's official residence.

Pavithran in the meantime tries to eliminate Unni in several ways but fails. He tells Menon that Unni should be killed. Menon gets stuck up at this and finally decides to be a good man. He secretly meets Unni and Shari in a sorry mood, and tells both to return home soon. He even decides to arrange a press meet to bring out all his corruptions. Pavithran finds that all his illegal wealth would be gone, and kills Menon using his henchmen depicting it as a lorry accident (by hitting the lorry with Menon's car). But unknown to him Menon's P.A, Joseph boards the car on which Menon travels for the press meet. Joseph survives the accident, and later relates it to Krishnakumar. He tracks down the lorry drivers but fruitless. He is finally informed by Pavithran's wife (Unni's elder sister), who had overheard Pavithran's conversations to kill Menon. Pavithran decides to flee but is confronted by Krishnakumar and the police. In a fight, Krishnakumar kills Pavithran using C.I Vijayan's gun and awaits arrest. But everyone convinces him to forget the incident. CI Vijayan consoles him and convinces him that the state needs incorruptible and honest ministers like him.The police closes down the F.I.R under CRPC 130/131 security acts.

In the end Krishnakumar is seen congratulated by Ex. C.M Avarachan and his mission continues by giving the message "Leadership is action and not position".

Cast

Dileep as B.Krishnakumar Menon a.k.a. Unni, Home Minister of Kerala
Kalasala Babu as Balagangadhara Menon, ex-Education Minister of Kerala
Sai Kumar as Pavithran IPS, Menon's son-in-law (antagonist)
Kavya Madhavan as Sharika Krishnakumar
Vijayaraghavan as CI Vijayan, Krishnakumar's security team member
Jagathy Sreekumar as Joseph, PA of Balagangadhara Menon and Unni
Innocent as Thomman Chacko, Chief Minister of Kerala
Shammi Thilakan as Collector Gopinath IAS
Riyaz Khan as ASP Harshan IPS
Karthika Mathew as Meenakshi Harshan aka Meenootty
Shobha Mohan as Lakshmi Menon
P. Sreekumar as Avarachan, Ex-Chief Minister of Kerala
Madhupal as Siddarthan, Krishnakumar's friend
Saji Soman as Ajayan, Krishnakumar's friend
Sreejith Ravi as Baby, Krishnakumar's friend
Bineesh Kodiyeri as Mukundan, Krishnakumar's friend
Bheeman Raghu as DYSP Anantharaghavan, Krishnakumar's security team member
Santhosh as SI Prathapa Varma, Krishnakumar's security team member
Sudheer Sukumaran as SI Anirudhan Varma
Bindu Panicker as Devaki, Sharika's mother
Saiju Kurup as Prasad
Suvarna Mathew as Rashmi Pavithran
Lakshmi Priya as Sobha Gopinath
Kollam Thulasi as Minister Divakaran
Poojapura Radhakrishnan as Minister Nandakumar
Salim Kumar as Pottakkuzhy Chellappan, Minister for Forests and Wildlife, Kerala
T. P. Madhavan as Minister Kizhuppally
Cochin Haneefa as Vendor Chandy
Idavela Babu as Pathrose, Thomman Chacko's P.A
Jagannatha Varma as DGP Sundaram IPS
Vishnu Prasad as SP Jayamohan IPS
Harisree Ashokan as Kannan, Election Posterman
Anil Murali as Vettoor Shivan
Bose Venkat
Kozhikode Narayanan Nair as Narayanan, Prasad's father
Ambika Mohan as Prasad's Mother
Ponnamma Babu as Advocate Mercy Varghese
Kalabhavan Prajod as TV Reporter Satheeshan
Nandu Pothuval as Ananthakumar, a corrupt journalist
Baburaj as Mohan, Pavithran's spy
Ashwin Menon as younger Krishnakumar
Pallavi Narayanan as younger Sharika

Production
The film shoots in Trivandrum and near places. Two songs Chirimani Mulle and Sundari Onnu Parayu in the film were choreographed in New Zealand.

Soundtrack
The music was by Deepak Dev and the lyrics were penned by Kaithapram Damodaran Namboothiri. The background music was scored by Ouseppachan.

Box office
The film was a blockbuster at the box office and received positive reviews from the critics.

References

External links
 

2000s Malayalam-language films
Indian political films
Indian action films
Films shot in Thiruvananthapuram
Fictional portrayals of the Kerala Police
Films scored by Deepak Dev
Films directed by Joshiy